An impact crater lake is a lake inside a depression caused by the impact of a meteor. It is also known as an annular lake in cases where the water body is shaped like a ring, as many impact crater lakes are.

Examples
It is Earth's sixth-largest confirmed impact crater according to rim-to-rim diameter.

List

See also

 Volcanic crater lake

References